Miss Dominican Republic 2021 was held on November 7, 2021 at Salón de Eventos Sambil. Kimberly Jiménez of La Romana crowned her successor at the end of the event. The winner represented Dominican Republic at Miss Universe 2021. The 1st Runner-Up competed in Miss United Continents 2021 and the 2nd Runner-Up will compete in Reina Hispanoamericana 2022.

Originally, Andreina Martínez of Comunidad Dominicana en los Estados Unidos was crowned the winner but tested positive for COVID-19 just after the competition. 1st Runner-Up Debbie Áflalo of Azua represented Dominican Republic at Miss Universe 2021 as Martínez not have time to quarantine before traveling to Israel for the competition and she will represented Dominican Republic at Miss Universe 2022 instead.

Results
Color keys

Special Awards

Candidates

Notes

References

External links

2021 in the Dominican Republic
2021
2021 beauty pageants
Beauty pageants in the Dominican Republic
Entertainment events in the Dominican Republic